Liangping District, formerly Liangping County and Liangshan County, is a district in the north of Chongqing Municipality, People's Republic of China.

Sports
The Liangping District National Fitness Centre Stadium, which has a capacity of 20,937, is the largest venue by capacity in Liangping. It opened in 2017.

Administrative divisions

Climate
Liangping has a monsoon-influenced humid subtropical climate (Köppen Cwa), with four distinct seasons and ample rainfall: winters are short, mild, and comparatively dry, while summers are long, hot, and humid. Around 71% of the annual precipitation falls from May to September.

Transport 
China National Highway 318 passes through Liangping. Liangping is served by Liangping railway station on the Dazhou-Wanzhou railway and Liangping South railway station on the Chongqing–Wanzhou intercity railway.

References

External links
Official website of Liangping Government

Districts of Chongqing